I'm So Indicted is a 2006 album by the Capitol Steps.

Track listing
Here's to You, Reverend Robertson
George Bush speaks
I'm So Indicted
What a Difference Delay Makes
Three Little Kurds from School
Government Lessons for Little Children: Chicken Little
Can't Get to a Church
GOP-BS
Sam Alito
In the Metro
How Do You Solve a Problem Like Korea?
Rolling Kidney Stones (A collection including Angioplasty, I've got a bald spot and I want to paint it black, You can't always eat what you want, and Hey; You; Get off of my lawn. "Jumping Hot Flash", "Time is not on my side" and "Blood, Sugar")
Dubai Dubai Doo
This is the House that Jack Bribed
FU Airlines
Living Will
Old Finger
Rafael Palmeiro's Greatest Hits
John Bolton Goes to the U.N.
Michael Brown
Deep Throat
When I'm 84
God Bless My S.U.V.
Lirty Dies: Ecret Sagents, Ack Jabramoff, Chick Daney, Yubble-Doo and the Storrible Horm

Songs parodied
In album order:

 Mrs. Robinson
 (spoken word)
 I'm So Excited
 What a Difference a Day Made
 Three Little Maids From School (from Gilbert and Sullivan's The Mikado)
 (spoken word)
 Get Me to the Church on Time
 Sesame Street Theme, Bye Bye Blackbird (GOP-BS)
 Mona Lisa
 In the Ghetto
 Maria
 Angie, Paint it Black, You Can't Always Get What You Want, Get Off Of My Cloud, A Little Help From My Friends (Rolling Kidney Stones)
 Strangers in the Night
 (spoken word)
 Snowbird
 (spoken word)
 Goldfinger
 Lookin' For Love, I Shot the Sheriff, Time in a Bottle, Itsy Bitsy Teenie Weenie Yellow Polka Dot Bikini (Rafael Palmeiro's greatest Hits)
(spoken word)
 Charlie Brown
 (spoken word)
 When I'm 64
 God Bless the USA
 (spoken word)

New lyrics by Bill Strauss, Elaina Newport and Mark Eaton, with Bari Biern and Janet Davidson Gordon for "Old Finger", Mike Tilford for "Deep Throat" and Michael Forrest for "Can't Get To a Church."

Production personnel
Producer: Elaina Newport
Director: Bill Strauss
Sound Engineers: Jim Smith and Greg Hammon
Pianists: Howard Breitbart, Eileen Cornett, Dave Kane, Marc Irwin, Emily Bell Spitz and Lenny Wiliams
Cassettes and CDs pressed by Lion Recording

References

Capitol Steps albums
2006 live albums
Self-released albums
2000s comedy albums